WOZQ (91.9 FM) is a radio station licensed to serve Northampton, Massachusetts.  The station is owned by Smith College and licensed to the Trustees of the Smith College. It airs a college radio format.

The station was assigned the WOZQ call letters by the Federal Communications Commission on November 9, 1981.

References

External links
WOZQ official website

OZQ
Radio stations established in 1982
Mass media in Hampshire County, Massachusetts
Smith College
Northampton, Massachusetts
1982 establishments in Massachusetts